US Post Office-Gouverneur is a historic post office building located at Gouverneur in St. Lawrence County, New York. It was designed and built in 1915–1917, and is one of a number of post offices in New York State designed by the Office of the Supervising Architect of the Treasury Department, James A. Wetmore.  The building is in the Colonial Revival style and is a one-story, five bay masonry structure clad with a low limestone faced foundation. The main facade features a three bay recessed portico.

It was listed on the National Register of Historic Places in 1989.

References

Gouverneur
Colonial Revival architecture in New York (state)
Government buildings completed in 1917
Buildings and structures in St. Lawrence County, New York
National Register of Historic Places in St. Lawrence County, New York